Pleroma raddianum, synonyms including Pleroma pulchrum  (Cham.) Triana and Tibouchina pulchra, is a plant species in the family Melastomataceae.

It is a pioneer tree species, growing after land degradation, in the Atlantic Rainforest of Sao Paulo State in Brazil, a forest which only 12 percent of original area remains.

2,6-Dimethoxybenzoquinone is a toxic chemical compound found in P. raddianum.

References

External links

raddianum